Bely Yar (Khakas: Хуба Чар, Xuba Çar) is a rural locality (a selo) and the administrative center of Altaysky District of the Republic of Khakassia, Russia. Population:

References

Notes

Sources

Rural localities in Khakassia